is the 26th single by Japanese pop duo Puffy AmiYumi released on August 6, 2008.

A limited edition of the single was released along with the regular edition. The limited edition features a different cover and contains an extra live DVD showing footage of 4 songs from Puffy's 2007 honeysweeper tour at SHIBUYA-AX.

Track listing

CD Single
1. マイストーリー (My Story)
2. Twilight Shooting Star!
3. All Because Of You (DISCO TWINS Remix)

CD + DVD (Limited Edition only)

CD Single
1. マイストーリー (My Story)
2. Twilight Shooting Star!
3. All Because Of You (DISCO TWINS Remix)

DVD
1. サヨナラサマー (Sayonara Samaa/So Long, Summer)
2. オリエンタル・ダイヤモンド (Oriental Diamond)
3. 赤いブランコ (Akai Buranko/Red Swing)
4. 渚にまつわるエトセトラ (Nagisa ni Matsuwaru Et Cetera/Electric Beach Fever)

2008 singles
Puffy AmiYumi songs
2008 songs
Ki/oon Music singles